The first season of the television comedy series The Goldbergs aired on ABC from September 24, 2013 to May 13, 2014. It was produced by Adam F. Goldberg Productions, Happy Madison Productions and Sony Pictures Television with series creator Adam F. Goldberg serving as executive producer, alongside Doug Robinson, and Seth Gordon.

The show explores the daily lives of the Goldberg family, a family living in Jenkintown, Pennsylvania in the 1980s. Beverly Goldberg (Wendi McLendon-Covey), the overprotective matriarch of the Goldbergs is married to Murray Goldberg (Jeff Garlin). They are the parents of three children, Erica (Hayley Orrantia), Barry  (Troy Gentile), and Adam (Sean Giambrone). 

After airing only six episodes, ABC gave the show a full season pickup of 23 episodes. It was renewed for a second season on May 8, 2014.

The first episode premiered to 8.94 million viewers, second only to NCIS: Los Angeles. It garnered a 3.1/8 adults 18-49 rating, beating the aforementioned NCIS: Los Angeles, as well as New Girl and Capture.

Cast

Main cast
 Wendi McLendon-Covey as Beverly Goldberg
 Sean Giambrone as Adam Goldberg
 Troy Gentile as Barry Goldberg
 Hayley Orrantia as Erica Goldberg
 George Segal as Albert "Pops" Solomon
 Jeff Garlin as Murray Goldberg

Recurring cast
 Natalie Alyn Lind as Dana Caldwell, Adam's love interest
 AJ Michalka as Lainey Lewis, Erica's best friend and Barry's love interest
 Kenny Ridwan as Dave Kim, one of Adam's friends
 Virginia Gardner as Lexi Bloom
 Stephanie Catherine Grant as Emmy Mirsky, one of Adam's friends
 Jacob Hopkins as Chad Kremp

Episodes

References

The Goldbergs (2013 TV series) seasons
2013 American television seasons
2014 American television seasons